The 50th District of the Iowa Senate is located in eastern Iowa, and is currently composed of Dubuque County.

Current elected officials
Pam Jochum is the senator currently representing the 50th District.

The area of the 50th District contains two Iowa House of Representatives districts:
The 99th District (represented by Lindsay James)
The 100th District (represented by Charles Isenhart)

The district is also located in Iowa's 1st congressional district, which is represented by Ashley Hinson.

Past senators
The district has previously been represented by:

Mike Gronstal, 1985–1992
Eugene Fraise, 1993–2002
Mike Gronstal, 2003–2012
Pam Jochum, 2013–present

References

50